The 2003–04 Swiss Challenge League was the first season of the Swiss Challenge League, and the 72nd season of the second tier of the Swiss football league pyramid. It began on 18 July 2003 and ended on 22 May 2004. The champions of this season, FC Schaffhausen, earned promotion to the 2004–05 Super League. SR Delémont finished last and were relegated to the Swiss 1. Liga.

League table

Promotion/relegation playoff

Promoted clubs 
 To Super League - FC Schaffhausen
 FC Wil replaces SR Delémont to increase the league's size to 18 clubs
From 1. Liga - SC YF Juventus and FC Baulmes

Relegated clubs 
 To 1. Liga - SR Delémont

References

External links
 Swiss Challenge League

Swiss Challenge League seasons
Swiss
2003–04 in Swiss football